Caribbean music genres are very diverse. They are each synthesis of African, European, Arab, Asian, and Indigenous influences, largely created by descendants of African slaves (see Afro-Caribbean music), along with contributions from other communities (such as Indo-Caribbean music). Some of the styles to gain wide popularity outside the Caribbean include, bachata, merengue, palo, mambo, denbo, baithak gana, bouyon, cadence-lypso, calypso, soca, chutney, chutney-soca, compas, dancehall, jing ping, parang, pichakaree, punta, ragga, reggae, dembow, reggaeton, salsa, soca, and zouk. Caribbean music is also related to Central American and South American music.

The history of Caribbean music originates from the history of the Caribbean itself. That history is one of the native land invaded by outsiders; violence, slavery, and even genocide factor in.

Following Christopher Columbus' 1492 landing, Spain claimed the entire region as its own. That didn't sit well with either the natives or Spain's European neighbors; within a few years, bloody battles raged across the islands of the Caribbean, fought by Spain, France, England, Denmark, and the Netherlands. All these battles (and diseases brought from Europe) decimated the native tribes, with entire cultures wiped out.

Thus the Caribbean was colonized as part of the various European empires. Native cultures were further eroded when the Europeans imported African slaves to work the sugar and coffee plantations on their island colonies. In many cases, native cultures (and native musics) were replaced by those imported from Africa and Europe.

At this point, whatever common Caribbean culture existed was splintered. Each of the European powers had imposed its own culture on the islands they had claimed. In the late 20th century, many Caribbean islands gained independence from colonial rule but the European influences can still be heard in the music of each subtly different culture.

Island-specific culture also informs the music of the Caribbean. Every island has its distinct musical styles, all inspired, to one degree or another, by the music brought over from the African slaves. As such, most Caribbean music, however unique to its own island culture, includes elements of African music - heavy use of percussion, complex rhythmic patterns, and call-and-response vocals. In many cases, the difference between one style and another comes down to the rhythms utilized in each music; every island has its own rhythmic sensibilities.

The complex deep origins of Caribbean music are best understood with a knowledge of Western Hemisphere colonial immigration patterns, human trafficking patterns, the resulting melting pot of people each of its nations and territories, and thus resulting influx of original musical influences. Colonial Caribbean ancestors were predominantly from West Africa, West Europe, and India. In the 20th and 21st centuries immigrants have also come from Taiwan, China, Indonesia/Java, and the Middle East. Neighboring Latin American and North American (particularly hip hop and pop music) countries have also naturally influenced Caribbean culture and vice versa. While there are musical commonalities among Caribbean nations and territories, the variation in immigration patterns and colonial hegemony tend to parallel the variations in musical influence. Language barriers (Spanish, Portuguese, English, Hindustani, Tamil, Telugu, Arabic, Chinese, Hebrew, Yiddish, Yoruba, African languages, Indian languages, Amerindian languages, French, Indonesian, Javanese, and Dutch) are one of the strongest influences.

Divisions between Caribbean music genres are not always well-defined, because many of these genres share common relations, instrumentation and have influenced each other in many ways and directions. For example, the Jamaican mento style has a long history of conflation with Trinidadian calypso. Elements of calypso have come to be used in mento, and vice versa, while their origins lie in the Caribbean culture, each uniquely characterized by influences from the Shango and Shouters religions of Trinidad and the Kumina spiritual tradition of Jamaica. Music from the Spanish-speaking areas of the Caribbean are classified as tropical music in the Latin music industry.

Antigua and Barbuda
By the mid-20th century Antigua and Barbuda boasted lively calypso and steelpan scenes as part of its annual Carnival celebration.  Hell’s Gate, along with Brute Force and the Big Shell Steelband, were the first Caribbean steelbands to be recorded and featured on commercial records thanks to the efforts of the American record producer Emory Cook. Short Shirt, Swallow, and Obstinate were among the most popular calypsonians who competed in the island's annual calypso competition.

Benna

Benna is an uptempo Antiguan folk song, also spelled bennah and known as ditti. It is characterized by lyrics that focus on scandalous gossip, performed in a call and response style. It has also been a means of folk communication, spreading news and political commentary across the island. Other genres include:

 Extempo
 Iron Band
 Pan music
 Soca

Bahamas

 Goombay
 Junkanoo
 Rake-and-scrape
 Bahamian Rhyming Spiritual

Barbados

 Folk
 Tuk
 Spouge
 Fling
 Calypso jazz
 Iron Band
 Ragga Soca
 Reggae
 Soca
 Bashment Soca

Belize

 Punta
 Punta rock
 Chumba
 Fedu
 Brukdown
 Reggae
 Dancehall
 Cumbia
 Bachata

Colombia

 Berroche
 Bullerengue
 Champeta
 Chandé
 Chalupa
 Cumbia
 Cumbión
 Fandango
 Garabato
 Grito e' monte
 Guacherna
 Guaracha
 Jalao
 Lumbalú
 Mapalé
 Merecumbé
 Millo
 Parrandín
 Paseaito
 Perillero
 Porro
 Salsa
 Son Faroto
 Son de Negro
 Son Sabanero
 Son Palenquero
 Tambora (Golpe de tambora)
 Terapia
 Zafra
 Vallenato y sus aires:
 Paseo
 Son
 Merengue
 Puya
 Tambora
 Abambucao
 Romanza vallenata
 Piqueria
 Calipso
 Foxtrot
 Mazurka
 Mento
 ModeUp
 Dancehall
 Pasillo Isleño
 Polka
 Praise Hymn
 Quadrille
 Reggae
 Schottis
 Socca
 Ska
 Vals isleño
 Zouk

Cuba

 Abwe
 Afro-Cuban jazz
 Areito
 Bakosó
 Batá and yuka
 Batá-rumba
 Bembe
 Boogaloo
 Bolero
 Chachachá
 Changui
 Charanga
 Conga
 Columbia
 Comparsa
 Criolla
 Cuban hip hop
 Cuban jazz
 Cubatón
 Danzón
 Danzonete
 Dengue
 Descarga
 Filín
 Folk
 Guaguanco
 Guajira
 Guaracha
 Guarapachangueo
 Habanera
 Latin Jazz
 Mambo
 Mozambique
 Nueva trova
 Paca
 Pachanga
 Pilón
 Pregón
 Punto guajiro
 Reggae en Español
 Rock
 Rumba
 Salsa
 Son
 Son-batá
 Songo
 Son Montuno
 Timba
 Trova
 Tumba francesa
 UPA
 Yambú

Dominica

Chanté mas

Chanté mas (masquerade song) is a tradition from the music of Dominica, based in Carnival celebrations and performed by groups of masquerading partygoers. They use the call-and-response format, and lyrics are often light-hearted insulting, and discuss local scandals and rumors. Other genres include:

 Bélé
 Calypso music
 Bouyon music
 Cadence-lypso
 Jing-Ping
 Kadans
 Mini-jazz
 Quadrille
 Zouk

soca music

Dominican Republic

 Bachata
 Bolero
 Latin Rap
 Merengue
 Perico Ripiao
 Pambiche
 Palo music
 Tumba
 Zapateo
 Carabiné
 Merengue House
 Salsa
 Mangulina
 Son
 Trapchata
 Zarambo
 Dominican Rock

Dutch West Indies
Bari is a festival, dance, drum and song type from the Dutch Antillean island of Bonaire. It is led by a single singer, who improvises. Lyrics often concern local figures and events of importance.

Quimbe is a topical song form from the Dutch Antillean St Maarten. It traditionally accompanies the ponum dance and drumming, but is now often performed without accompaniment. Lyrics include gossip, news and social criticism, and use clever puns and rhymes. Performance is often competitive in nature.

Tumba is a style of Curaçao music, strongly African in origin, despite the name's origin in a 17th-century Spanish dance. Traditional tumba is characterized by scandalous, gossiping and accusatory lyrics, but modern tumba often eschews such topics. It is well known abroad, and dates to the early 19th century. It is now a part of the Carnival Road March.

Other genres include:

 Latin Rap
 Ritmo Kombiná
 Tambú
 Seú
 Wals
 Zumbi

Guadeloupe

 Balakadri
 Biguine vidé
 Bouyon gwada
 Cadence-lypso
 Gwo ka
 Hip hop
 Kadans
 Mini-jazz
 Zouk

Guyana
Shanto is a form of Guyanese music, related to both calypso and mento, and became a major part of early popular music through its use in Guyanese vaudeville shows; songs are topical and light-hearted, often accompanied by a guitar. Other genres include:

 Chutney
 Chutney Soca
 Dancehall
Calypso

Haiti

Compas / kompa
Compas, short for compas direct, is the modern méringue (mereng in creole) that was popularized in the mid-1950s by the sax and guitar player Nemours Jean-Baptiste. His méringue soon became popular throughout the Antilles, especially in Martinique and Guadeloupe. Webert Sicot and Nemours Jean-Baptiste became the two leaders in the group. Sicot then left and formed a new group and an intense rivalry developed, though they remained good friends. To differentiate himself from Nemours, Sicot called his modern méringue, Cadence rampa.

In Creole, it is spelled as konpa dirèk or simply konpa. It is commonly spelled as it is pronounced as kompa.

Méringue
Evolving in Haiti during the mid-1800s, the Haitian méringue (known as the mereng in creole) is regarded as the oldest surviving form of its kind performed today and is its national symbol. According to Jean Fouchard, mereng evolved from the fusion of slave music genres (such as the chica and calenda) with ballroom forms related to the French-Haitian contredanse (kontradans in creole). Mereng's name, he says, derives from the mouringue music of the Bara, a tribe of Madagascar. That few Malagasies came to the Americas casts doubt on this etymology, but it is significant because it emphasizes what Fouchard (and most Haitians) consider the African-derived nature of their music and national identity. Méringue has lost popularity to konpa.

Mizik rasin
Mizik rasin is a musical movement that began in Haïti in 1987 when musicians began combining elements of traditional Haitian Vodou ceremonial and folkloric music with rock and roll.  This style of modern music reaching back to the roots of Vodou tradition came to be called mizik rasin ("roots music") in Haitian Creole or musique racine in French.  In context, the movement is often referred to simply as rasin or racine.

Starting in the late 1970s (with discontent surrounding the increasing opulence of the Duvalier dictatorship), youth from Port-au-Prince (and to a lesser extent Cap-Haïtien and other urban areas) began experimenting with new types of life. François Duvalier's appropriation of Vodou images as a terror technique, the increase in U.S. assembly and large-scale export agriculture, the popularity of disco, and Jean-Claude Duvalier's appreciation of konpa and chanson française disillusioned many youth and love.

To question the dictatorship's notion of "the Haitian nation" (and thus the dictatorship itself), several men began trying a new way of living, embodied in the Sanba Movement. They drew upon global trends in black power, Bob Marley, "Hippie"-dom, as well as prominently from rural life in Haiti. They dressed in the traditional blue denim (karoko) of peasants, eschewed the commercialized and processed life offered by global capitalism, and celebrated the values of communal living. Later, they adopted matted hair which resembled dreadlocks, but identified the style as something which existed in Haiti with the term cheve simbi, referring to water spirits.

In the 1990s, commercial success came to the musical genre that came to be known as mizik rasin, or "roots music".  Musicians like Boukman Eksperyans, and Boukan Ginen, and to a lesser extent RAM, incorporated reggae, rock and funk rhythms into traditional forms and instrumentation, including rara, music from kanaval, or traditional spiritual music from the rural hamlets called lakous, like Lakou Souvnans, Lakou Badjo, Lakou Soukri, or Lakou Dereyal.

Twoubadou
Twoubadou is another form of folk music played by peripatetic troubadours playing some combination of acoustic, guitar, beat box and accordion instruments singing ballads of Haitian, French or Caribbean origin. It is in some ways similar to Son Cubano from Cuba as a result of Haitian migrant laborers who went to work on Cuban sugar plantations at the turn of the century. Musicians perform at the Port-au-Prince International Airport and also at bars and restaurants in Pétion-Ville.

Other

 Cadence rampa (kadans)
 Coumbite (kombite)
 Haitian Gospel
 Haitian hip hop (rap kreyòl)
 Haitian rock (rock kreyòl)
 Kontradans
 Mini-jazz
 Rabòday
 Rara
 Rara tech
 Vodou drumming
 Zouk

Bachata

Honduras 

The music of Honduras is varied. Punta is the main "ritmo" of Honduras, with similar sounds such as Caribbean salsa, merengue, reggae,  reggaeton, And kompa  all widely heard especially in the North, to Mexican rancheras heard in the interior rural part of the country. Honduras' capital Tegucigalpa is an important center for modern Honduran music, and is home to the College for Fine Arts.

Folk music is played with guitar, marimba and other instruments. Popular folk songs include La ceiba and Candú.

Other genres include:

 Reggaeton
 Rock
 Garifuna music
 Bachata
 Matamuerte
 Classical music
 Merengue
 Hip Hop
 Pop Latino
 Cumbia
 Salsa
 Spanish rock

Jamaica
Reggae is a music genre first developed in Jamaica in the late 1960s. While sometimes used in a broader sense to refer to most types of Jamaican music, the term reggae more properly denotes a particular music style that originated following on the development of ska and rocksteady.

Ska is a music genre that originated in Jamaica in the late 1950s, and was the precursor to rocksteady and reggae. Ska combined elements of Caribbean mento and calypso with American jazz and rhythm and blues. It is characterized by a walking bass line accented with rhythms on the upbeat.

Mento is a form of Jamaican folk music that uses topical lyrics with a humorous slant, commenting on poverty and other social issues. Sexual innuendos are also common. Mento was strongly influenced by calypso, the musical traditions of the Kumina religion and Cuban music. During the mid-20th century, mento was conflated with calypso, and mento was frequently referred to as calypso, kalypso and mento calypso; mento singers frequently used calypso songs and techniques.

Other genres include:

 Dancehall
 Dub
 Kumina
 Lovers rock
 Nyabinghi
 Ragga
 Rocksteady
 Roots reggae
 Soca music

Martinique

 Bèlè (Bel Air)
 Biguine
 Chouval bwa
 Hip hop
 Jump up
 Kadans
 Mini-jazz
 Quadrille
 Zouk
 Mazouk (Mazurka)

Puerto Rico

 Aguinaldo
 Balada
 Boogaloo
 Bomba
 Danza
 Décima
 Guaracha
 Latin hip hop
 Latin house
 Latin trap
 Plena
 Reggae en Español
 Reggaeton
 Salsa
 Salsa romántica 
Spanish dancehall
 Seis

Saint Kitts and Nevis

 Big Drum
 Calypso
 Soca
 Steelpan
 Stringband music

Saint Lucia
Jwé is a kind of rural music from Saint Lucia, performed informally at wakes, beach parties, full moon gatherings and other events, including débòt dances. Jwé uses raunchy lyrics and innuendos to show off verbal skills, and to express political and comedic commentaries on current events and well-known individuals. One well-known technique that has entered Lucian culture is lang dévivé, which is when the singer says the opposite of his true meaning. Other genres include:

 Calypso
 Extempo
 Kont
 Soca
 Zouk
 Dancehall
 Dub
 Reggae

Saint Vincent and the Grenadines
Big Drum is a style found in Saint Vincent and the Grenadines and elsewhere in the Windward Islands, especially Carriacou. It is accompanied by drums traditionally made from tree trunks, though rum kegs are now more common. Satirical and political lyrics are common, performed by a female singer called a chantwell and accompanied by colorfully costumed dancers. Big Drum is performed at celebrations like weddings and the launchings of new boats. Chutney-soca is another genre.

Suriname
Kaseko is a music genre that originated in Suriname. The term Kaseko is probably derived from the French expression casser le corps (break the body), which was used during slavery to indicate a very swift dance. It is a fusion of numerous popular and folk styles. It is rhythmically complex, with percussion instruments including skratji (a very large bass drum). Songs are typically call-and-response.

Other genres include:

 Baithak Gana
 Indo-Caribbean
 Aleke
 Kawina

Trinidad and Tobago

Calypso

Calypso is a Trinidadian music, which traditionally uses a slow tempo to accompany vocalist-composers, or calypsonians. Songs are often improvised and humorous, with sexual innuendo, political and social commentary, and picong, a style of lyricism that teases people in a light-hearted way. Calypso is competitively performed in calypso tents at Carnival. Calypso uses rhythms derived from West Africa, with cut time, and features dance as an important component. Calypso's roots were frequently ascribed to the Bahamas, Jamaica, Bermuda or the Virgin Islands. Calypso can be traced back to at least 1859, when a visiting ornithologist in Trinidad ascribed calypso's origins in British ballads. While calypso has a diverse heritage, calypso became a distinct genre when it developed in Trinidad. The word caliso refers to topical songs in the dialect of Saint Lucia, and may be linguistically related to the word calypso.

Cariso

Cariso is a kind of Trinidadian folk music, and an important ancestor of calypso music. It is lyrically topical, and frequently sarcastic or mocking in the picong tradition, and is sung primarily in French creole by singers called chantwells. Cariso may come from carieto, a Carib word meaning joyous song, and can also be used synonymously with careso.

Chutney
Chutney is a form indigenous to the southern Caribbean, popular in Guyana, Trinidad, Jamaica and Suriname.  It derives elements from traditional Indian music and popular Trinidadian Soca music.

Soca
Soca is a style of Caribbean music originating in Trinidad and Tobago.

Soca originally combined the melodic lilting sound of calypso with insistent cadence percussion (which is often electronic in recent music), and Indian musical instruments—particularly the dholak, tabla and dhantal—as demonstrated in Shorty's classic compositions "Ïndrani" and "Shanti Om". During the 80's, the influence of zouk as popularized by the French Antillean band Kassav' had a major impact on the development of modern soca music.

Other

 Afrosoca
 Chut-kai-pang
 Chutney-soca
 Caribbean pop
 Gospelypso
 Indo-Caribbean
 Kaiso
 Pan music
 Parang
 Pichakaree
 Rapso
 Yahdees

Venezuela
 Musica llanera
 Merengue
 Gaita
 Tambores

Virgin Islands

Careso
Careso is a Virgin Islander song form, which is now entirely performed for special holiday and appreciation or education events, by folkloric ensembles. It is similar to quelbe in some ways, but has more sustained syllables, a more African melodic style and an all female, call and response format with lyrics that function as news and gossip communicator, also commemorating and celebrating historical events.

Other
 Scratch band
 Bamboula
 Masquerade music

Quelbe

Quelbe is a form of Virgin Islander folk music that originated on St. Croix, now most commonly performed by groups called scratch bands. Traditionally, however, quelbe was performed informally by solo singers at festivals and other celebrations. Hidden meanings and sexual innuendos were common, and lyrics focused on political events like boycotts.

Yucatán, Mexico

 Bolero
 Chachachá
 Conga
 Criolla
 Danzón
 Guaracha
 Mambo
 Marimba
 Salsa
 Son
 Troval
 Cumbia

References

External links
 The Diaz Ayala Cuban and Latin American Popular Music Collection http://latinpop.fiu.edu/
Brill, Mark. Music of Latin America and the Caribbean, 2nd Edition, 2018. Taylor & Francis 
Manuel, Peter. Caribbean Currents: Caribbean Music from Rumba to Reggae (Temple University Press, 1995). ISBN 1566393388 

 
Caribbean
Caribbean